The Pernambuco Brasil Open Series is a tennis tournament held in Recife, Brazil since 2011. The event is part of the ATP Challenger Tour and is played on hard courts.

Past finals

Singles

Doubles

References

ATP Challenger Tour
Tennis tournaments in Brazil
Hard court tennis tournaments